Senator Loomis may refer to:

Chauncey Loomis (1780s–1817), New York State Senate
Chester Loomis (1789–1873), New York State Senate
Dwight Loomis (1821–1903), Connecticut State Senate
James Chaffee Loomis (1807–1877), Connecticut State Senate
James H. Loomis (1823–1914), New York State Senate
Orland Steen Loomis (1893–1942), Wisconsin State Senate